Bodyguard is a British political thriller television series created and written by Jed Mercurio and produced by World Productions as part of ITV Studios for the BBC. The six-part series centres around the fictional character of Police Sergeant David Budd (Richard Madden), a British Army war veteran suffering from PTSD, who is now working for the Royalty and Specialist Protection Branch of London's Metropolitan Police Service. He is assigned as the principal protection officer (PPO) for the ambitious Home Secretary Julia Montague (Keeley Hawes), whose politics he despises. The series draws attention to controversial issues such as  government monitoring of private information and its regulation, the politics of intervention and terrorism, and PTSD.

The series began broadcasting on BBC One on 26 August 2018, achieving the highest viewing figures for a new BBC drama in the multichannel era and the highest BBC viewing figures since 2008. The BBC commissioned the series from the then-independent World Productions in 2016. Since ITV Studios Global Entertainment acquired the company in 2017, they have handled international distribution for the series. Netflix agreed to a distribution deal to broadcast the show outside the United Kingdom and Ireland.

The series was met with critical acclaim, particularly for Madden's performance. The series received numerous award nominations including the Golden Globe Award for Best Television Series – Drama, with Madden winning the Golden Globe Award for Best Actor – Television Series Drama. At the 71st Primetime Emmy Awards, the series was nominated for Outstanding Drama Series.

A second series is in development.

Cast and characters

Main
Budd family
 Richard Madden as PS David Budd, a Scottish Afghanistan war veteran and dedicated Principal Protection Officer (PPO) at Protection Command. His wartime experiences have left him struggling with PTSD, mistrustful of politicians and prone to volatile behaviour. Assigned to protect Montague, whose politics he loathes, Budd is left conflicted over where his loyalties lie.
 Sophie Rundle as Vicky Budd, David's wife and the mother of their two children, who works as a ward sister at a London hospital. David's unpredictable moods and issues with PTSD since returning from Afghanistan left them estranged.

Government
 Keeley Hawes as The Rt. Hon. Julia Montague MP, the Home Secretary and Conservative Party Member of Parliament for the fictional constituency of Thames West. Both Montague's political ambition and her controversial "Snoopers' Charter" RIPA 18 bill, which infringes civil liberties, leave her with many enemies.
 Vincent Franklin as Mike Travis MP, Minister of State for Counter-Terrorism, who grows increasingly resentful over being excluded from Montague's dealings with MI5.
 Nicholas Gleaves as The Rt. Hon. Roger Penhaligon MP, the Government Chief Whip, Member of Parliament for Surrey North and Montague's ex-husband. A staunch supporter of the Prime Minister, he becomes increasingly suspicious and wary of Julia's political ambition.
 David Westhead as The Rt. Hon. John Vosler MP, the Prime Minister and Leader of the Conservative Party.
 Paul Ready as Rob MacDonald, Special Advisor to the Home Secretary, who has a crush on Montague.

Police
 Gina McKee as Commander Anne Sampson, Head of Counter Terrorism Command (SO15) and Sharma's superior. Threatened by Montague's preference for MI5, Sampson enlists Budd's help.
 Pippa Haywood as CSI Lorraine Craddock, Budd's commanding officer at Protection Command who assigns him to protect Montague.
 Ash Tandon as DCI Deepak Sharma, a senior detective in SO15 leading the investigation into the recent series of terror activities. As things fail to add up, he becomes suspicious of Budd.
 Nina Toussaint-White as DS Louise Rayburn, an SO15 officer working under Sharma who starts to work with Budd.

Security Service / MI5
 Stuart Bowman as Stephen Hunter-Dunn, Director General of the Security Service (MI5), whose surveillance powers will be significantly enhanced by RIPA 18. Montague's preference for MI5 over SO15 puts him at odds with Sampson.
 Michael Shaeffer as "Richard Longcross", an enigmatic MI5 agent working under Hunter-Dunn who becomes involved in a cat-and-mouse game with Budd.

Criminals
 Tom Brooke as Andy Apsted, a war veteran and friend of Budd's. Scarred both physically and mentally by his experiences in Afghanistan, Apsted leads the anti-war Veterans Peace Group and attempts to kill Montague.
 Matt Stokoe as Luke Aikens, a mysterious organised crime leader.
 Anjli Mohindra as Nadia Ali, implicated with her husband in an attempted bombing.

Recurring
Family
 Matthew Stagg as Charlie Budd, David and Vicky's 8-year-old son.
 Bella Padden as Ella Budd, David and Vicky's 10-year-old daughter.

Government
 Shubham Saraf as Tahir Mahmood, Montague's PR Adviser.
 Stephanie Hyam as Chanel Dyson, the PR Advisor to the Home Secretary before getting fired by Montague.

Police
 Claire-Louise Cordwell as Constable Kim Knowles, a Protection Command bodyguard in Budd's team.
 Richard Riddell as Constable Tom Fenton, a Protection Command bodyguard in Budd's team.

Episodes

Production

The series was largely filmed on location in London, including the Whittington Estate for Budd's flat and Battersea for Montague's flat. The bomb scenes in the final episode were filmed around CityPoint near Moorgate and Woburn Square and Senate House in Bloomsbury.

The train scenes in the first episode were filmed on the Mid-Norfolk Railway.

BBC journalists including Andrew Marr, John Pienaar, John Humphrys, and Laura Kuenssberg appear as themselves.

Reception

Audience
Viewing figures for the series were high, with 10.4 million (peaking at 11 million) viewers watching the overnight broadcast of the finale live on BBC One alone. As significant numbers of viewers watched the show on catchup service iPlayer after transmission, the series sparked a debate on how the media should handle spoilers. Radio Times revealed the fate of Montague in a cover story during the series's original transmission.

Critical response
The review aggregator Rotten Tomatoes gave the series a 93% approval rating, with an average rating of 8.2/10, based on 70 reviews. The critical consensus reads, "Bodyguard maintains a palpable tension throughout its pulpy proceedings to create an absorbing and addicting psychological thriller." On Metacritic, the series has a weighted average score of 79 out of 100 based on 12 reviews, indicating "generally favourable reviews".

In a positive review, Varietys Daniel D'Addario describes the series as "Both juicy in its delving into character psychology and rippingly ready to tear up its playbook as it goes, it’s a six-episode ride that demands, and rewards, a quick binge." D'Addario further states that the series "excels at both the daring, gasp-inducing twist and the methodical construction of slower-burning thrills", and that Madden's performance "by turns tripping on his own empathy, and angrily operating beyond rationality, makes us believe anything is possible — a wonderful asset for a show that seeks above all else to keep us watching". Allison Keene, writing for Collider, lauds the performances of the cast, describing Madden's as "enthralling" and "absolutely heartbreaking", and depicts the series as "an exhilarating ride that truly showcases Madden as a major talent". Writing for Time, Judy Berman states that the series "subverts thriller tropes just often enough to earn its reliance on them", and in a five-star review Guardian critic Lucy Mangan expresses that "[Mercurio] has created something as dark and moreish as ever". Hanh Nguyen of IndieWire describes the series as "relentless", and the performances of Madden and Hawes as "mesmerizing". Robert Rorke of the New York Post writes that the series is "gripping" and that Madden "gives a magnetic performance".

In a more mixed assessment, Robert Lloyd of the Los Angeles Times wrote that "Some elements of the series struck me as odd...and certain climactic revelations had me talking to the screen. But the action is well mounted and the tension tightly wound; it uncoils, when it does, with a satisfying snap". In a similarly mixed review, The Atlantics Sophie Gilbert acknowledged that "Hawes is elegantly unknowable as Julia...she gives just enough nuance in her performance to make you question whether she has a heart or is extremely deft at emotional manipulation", however she laments that "To watch Bodyguard’s six episodes is to suspend disbelief and submit to its surprises. It helps not to expect too much more than that, particularly when it comes to the show’s lavish employment of archetypes, which inevitably leads to its more questionable elements."

Intelligent Protection International Limited’s CEO Alex Bomberg on BBC Radio 5 Live said that the plot, in particular the personal relationship that Budd developed with his charge, would be frowned upon as both unprofessional and putting the charge at risk. Detective Chief Inspector Steve Ray, of the Royal and Specialist Protection Command (RaSP) told the BBC that “the relationship that we have with our principals is purely professional”, adding that anyone who crossed the line would quickly be identified and would not last very long in Protection Command or even in the police service”.

Accolades

Red Nose Bodyguard
A skit titled Red Nose Bodyguard was filmed in support of Comic Relief, featuring many cast members from the series as well as performances from Joanna Lumley, Adrian Dunbar and Sanjeev Bhaskar. The skit was first broadcast on Red Nose Day 2019 on 15 March 2019.

See also
List of fictional prime ministers of the United Kingdom

References

External links

2018 British television series debuts
2010s British crime drama television series
2010s British political television series
2020s British crime drama television series
2020s British political television series
BBC crime drama television shows
BBC high definition shows
British thriller television series
English-language television shows
Fiction about government
Islamic terrorism in fiction
Murder–suicide in television
Post-traumatic stress disorder in fiction
Television series by ITV Studios
Television series by World Productions
Television shows set in London
Terrorism in television
Works about police officers
Works about bodyguards